Rassvet is a rural locality (selo) in Gafuriysky Selsoviet, Buzdyaksky District, Bashkortostan, Russia. The population was 265 as of 2010. There are 4 streets.

Geography 
Rassvet is located 11 km north of Buzdyak (the district's administrative centre) by road.

References 

Rural localities in Buzdyaksky District